A zelyonka attack is a form of protest, provocation or violent assault, defined as throwing a solution of brilliant green (commonly known in Russian as zelyonka, зелёнка), a triarylmethane antiseptic dye, on the body (usually face) of a victim. On top of potential danger of vision loss, it is very hard to remove quickly; the complete natural removal may take up to a week.  In the 2010s, zelyonka attacks became widespread in Russia and Ukraine by pro-government activists against anti-government political and other personalities.

Zelyonka dye
Zelyonka is a triarylmethane antiseptic dye that is widely used medically in Russia and Ukraine. The dye, often used as a milder alternative to iodine, is available in Russian pharmacies and drug stores. The dye is very hard to wash off and can leave a stain for days afterwards, and requires an acid to fully remove. However, unless zelyonka is mixed with other substances (e.g. as with the second attack on Alexei Navalny), it leaves no long-term damage, and thus victims have little legal recourse.

Victims and influence 
The use of the dye was associated with pro-Kremlin activists, although it was never directly tied to the Russian government.  The victims of zelyonka attacks were almost always Russian opposition voices, such as Sergey Mitrokhin, Mikhail Kasyanov, Lyudmila Ulitskaya, Pussy Riot activists Maria Alyokhina and Nadezhda Tolokonnikova, and Alexei Navalny, and Ukrainian politicians, journalists and activists, including Petro Poroshenko, Arsen Avakov, Arseniy Yatsenyuk, Oleksandr Turchynov, Oleh Lyashko, and Ruslan Kotsaba.

As a result of numerous attacks, part of the Russian opposition leaders began to use zelyonka and green color as a "badge of honor". After Navalny was attacked in Barnaul, dozens of his supporters posted online photos of themselves "in green" (#GreenNavalny), and blogger Nikolai Danilov, who came to Red Square with a face covered with green colour, was detained by the police. When Kasyanov was attacked on the memorial march for Boris Nemtsov, the demonstrants began to cry out: "You won't pour zelyonka over us!"

On 4 May 2017, Alexei Navalny stated that the incidents involving zelyonka ended up helping his fundraising. On the same day, Russian poet Dmitry Bykov published a poem "Vivat, Green Russia!", in which green color was named as the color of "Russian revolution".

The numerous attacks on Russian anti-government political and media personalities, accompanied by photographs of people who were attacked with the dye, forced the Russian media to explain to their foreign readers, most of whom are not familiar with the brilliant green dye, just what zelyonka is and what has been happening.

See also

Dye pack
Acid throwing
Egging
Flour bombing
Glitter bombing
Inking (attack)
Milkshaking
Pieing
Shoe-throwing
Toilet papering

References

Sources 
 Brent Hierman. Russia and Eurasia 2017-2018. — Rowman & Littlefield, 2017. — P. 94. — 345 p. — .
 In Russia, a green-colored antiseptic becomes a weapon in attacks against opposition activists and journalists // Los Angeles Times. — 2017. — 3 May.
 Sarah Sloat: What Is «Zelyonka», the Russian Green Dye Weapon of Choice?  // Inverse. — 2017. — 2 May.
 Isabel Gorst: Russian opposition leader Alexei Navalny attacked with green dye // The Irish Times. — 2017. — 28 April.
 Eva Hartog: Why Russia's Opposition Now Takes Pride in «Brilliant Green» Attacks // The Moscow Times. — 2017. — 23 March.
 A Russian Man Wore Green Face Paint to Red Square in Support of Alexei Navalny. So the Cops Arrested Him // The Moscow Times. — 2017. — 20 March.
 Dan Bilefsky, Oleg Matsnev: A Putin Opponent Is Doused in Green. He Makes It Work / A Putin Critic Is Doused Bright Green; Selfies Follow // The New York Times. — 2017. — 21 March. — P. A10.
 Alexandra Arkhipova, Dmitry Doronin, Elena Iougaï, Anna Kirziouk, Darya Radtchenko Légitimation et disqualification par l'histoire dans les manifestations de rue en Russie (2011-2016) // Le Mouvement Social. — 2017. — Vol. 260, livr. 3. — P. 129. — ISSN 1961-8646. — DOI:10.3917/lms.260.0129.

Protests in Russia
Protest tactics
Attacks by method
Triarylmethane dyes
Alexei Navalny